Liolaemus kolengh is a species of lizard in the family Iguanidae.  It is found in Chile and Argentina.

References

kolengh
Lizards of South America
Reptiles of Chile
Reptiles described in 2006
Taxa named by Cristian Simón Abdala